Narcissus minor, the lesser daffodil or least daffodil, is a species of Narcissus within the family Amaryllidaceae. The species and its cultivar 'Little Gem' have both gained the Royal Horticultural Society's Award of Garden Merit.

Description 
Narcissus minor is a bulb plant which sprouts stems ranging from 8-25cm tall. Flowers are solitary, yellow in colour and grow between 25-40mm long. N. minor appears very similar to N. asturiensis, however N. minor possesses larger stems.

Distribution and habitat 
Narcissus minor is native to the Pyrenees mountain range, northern Spain and France, where it can be found growing in alpine habitat such as mountain meadows and in scrub. This species has also been introduced further into Europe where it has successfully naturalized in Austria.

References

minor
Garden plants of Europe
Taxa named by Carl Linnaeus
Plants described in 1762